M.V. Ramana Murthy is an Indian Scientist and Engineer, Mission Director for Deep Ocean mission and Director at National Centre for Coastal Research (NCCR), Ministry of Earth Sciences (MoES), Government of India. 

He is the former Director of Centre for Marine Living Resources & Ecology

Education and career
Dr. Murthy completed his B.E. in Civil engineering from Acharya Nagarjuna University, Andhra Pradesh. He did his M.Tech. and Ph.D. in Ocean Engineering from  Indian Institute of Technology, Madras. He has also done Masters degree in Planning from School of Planning, CEPT Ahmedabad.

He started his career in 1991 as a Senior Engineer at Visakhapatnam Port Trust and worked with Engineers India Ltd (EIL). Later in 1999 he joined as Scientist at National Centre for Coastal Research formally known as (ICMAM-PD), Chennai. Then he served as Group Head at National Institute of Ocean Technology (NIOT), Chennai heading Ocean Structures & Island Desalination from 2009 to 2017.

He is a member of Expert Appraisal Committee (EAC) at MoEF & CC to advise on Environmental Clearance (EC) in Infrastructure  and Coastal Regulation Zone (CRZ) projects at Pondicherry Coastal Zone Management Authority.

He is among working group to formulate policy for resettlement of displaced people affected by River and Coastal Erosion, NDMA. and member of Academic Council Kerala University of Fisheries and Ocean Studies (KUFOS).

Murthy is also the member of National Biodiversity Authority (NBA), Government of India. and Senate member at Tamil Nadu Dr. M.G.R. Medical University.

Contributions 
In 2019, Dr.Murthy worked for establishment of Desalination Plants in UT Lakshadweep Islands. 

He demonstrated his research to the society in implementation of Beach Restoration at Puducherry and Kadalur Periya Kuppam. Protection of Chellanam village in Kerala from flooding and sea erosion.

Murthy advised strategies on coastal protection in the states of Puducherry, Kerala, Tamil Nadu, Goa, Andhra Pradesh, Odisha.

He is a key person in offshore wind development for Gujarat and Tamil Nadu in demonstration of monopile based offshore wind measurement.

He had researched and advised on development of Urban Flood Warning System (I-Flows) for Mumbai and Chennai for flood forecasting and mitigation. With his experience in marine structures, a Detailed Project Report (DPR) for Kalpasar Project for creation of largest fresh water reservoir through building longest sea dyke (60.13 km) across Gulf of Khambhat and developed the framework for Marine Spatial Planning and Blue Economy.

Awards 
 National Award of Excellence 2021 in Ocean Technology, Ministry of Earth Sciences
 National Geo Science Award 2010
 Outstanding contribution in the field of Disaster Management, Ministry of Mines, Ministry of Earth Sciences Award 2006

Research and publications 
 Litter and plastic monitoring in the Indian marine environment.Environmental Science and Pollution Research; Environmental Science and Pollution Research, 2022
 Study of microplastics in the coastal waters in Bay of Bengal, 2022, vol:303
 Three Decades of Indian Remote Sensing in Coastal Research, 2021, Journal of the Indian Society of Remote Sensing
 Nutrient dynamics and budgeting in a semi-enclosed coastal hypersaline lagoon, 2021, Environmental Science and Pollution Research
 Connecting India's coastal monitoring program with UN Sustainable Development Goal 14, 2021, vol:215
 Prescribing sea water quality criteria through species sensitivity distribution, 2021
 Numerical studies on the thermal regimes of the horizontal tube falling film evaporation under varying feeder height, 2020, vol:17
 A review on the applications and recent advances in environmental DNA (eDNA) metagenomics, 2019
 Modification of tsunami wave by submarine canyon: case study of multiple canyons at south east coast of India, 2011, vol:34

References 

 Indian scientists
 Scientists from Chennai
 IIT Madras alumni
Year of birth missing (living people)
Living people